The Putnam County Confederate Memorial was erected in 1924 by the Patton Anderson Chapter, United Daughters of the Confederacy. On August 25, 2020, the Putnam County Commissioners voted 4–1 to remove it. Where it will be moved to was not decided at that meeting.

In November 2020, the board decided that the statue would be relocated to Putnam County Veterans Memorial Park but only if $200,000 in private funds was raised within 90 days from people inside of Putnam County.

See also
 List of monuments and memorials removed during the George Floyd protests

References

Monuments and memorials in the United States removed during the George Floyd protests
Buildings and structures in Putnam County, Florida
Confederate States of America monuments and memorials in Florida
Outdoor sculptures in Florida
Sculptures of men in Florida
Statues in Florida